

Paleozoology

Arthropods

Insects

Molluscs

Bivalves

Conodonts 
German paleontologist and stratigrapher Heinz Walter Kozur (1942-2013) and G.K. Merrill described the conodont genus Diplognathodus.

Vertebrates

Dinosaurs

Newly named dinosaurs 
Data courtesy of George Olshevsky's dinosaur genera list.

Newly named birds

Pterosaurs

New taxa

Incertae sedis

New taxa

References

 
Paleontology
Paleontology 5